3,3',5-Triiodothyronamine is a thyronamine.

References

Iodinated tyrosine derivatives
Thyroid